K167 or K-167 may refer to:

K-167 (Kansas highway), a state highway in Kansas
Mass in C major, K. 167 "in honorem Sanctissimae Trinitatis"